Dobravica is a small settlement in the Municipality of Radovljica in the Upper Carniola region of Slovenia.

References

External links 
Dobravica at Geopedia

Populated places in the Municipality of Radovljica